The Town of Randolph is a suburban city in Norfolk County, Massachusetts, United States. At the 2020 census, the city population was 34,984. Randolph adopted a charter effective January 2010 providing for a council-manager form of government instead of the traditional town meeting. Randolph is one of thirteen Massachusetts municipalities that have applied for, and been granted, city forms of government but wish to retain "The town of" in their official names.

History

Before European colonization the area that is now Randolph was occupied by the Massachusett, Wampanoag, and Pokanoket tribes. It was called Cochaticquom by the local Cochato and Ponkapoag tribes. The town was incorporated in 1793 from what was formerly the south precinct of the town of Braintree. According to the centennial address delivered by John V. Beal, the town was named after Peyton Randolph, first president of the Continental Congress.

Randolph was formerly the home of several large shoe companies. Many popular styles were made exclusively in Randolph, including the "Randies". At the time of Randolph's incorporation in 1793, local farmers were making shoes and boots to augment household incomes from subsistence farming. In the next half century, this sideline had become the town's major industry, attracting workers from across New England, Canada and Ireland and later from Italy and Eastern Europe, each adding to the quality of life in the town. By 1850, Randolph had become one of the nation's leading boot producers, shipping boots as far away as California and Australia.

The decline of the shoe industry at the beginning of the twentieth century led to Randolph's evolution as a suburban residential community. Boot and shoe making has been supplanted by light manufacturing and service industries. The town's proximity to major transportation networks has resulted in an influx of families from Boston and other localities who live in Randolph but work throughout the metropolitan area.

Starting in the 1950s, Randolph saw significant growth in its Jewish community with the exodus of Jews from Boston's Dorchester and Mattapan neighborhoods. In 1950, fifteen or twenty Jewish families lived in the town; by 1970, Randolph had about 7,000 Jewish residents, and about 9,000 in 1980, the largest such community south of Boston. At its peak, Randolph had a kosher butcher, Judaica shop, kosher bakery, and two synagogues. By the early 1990s, the population shrank to about 6,000.

The inspiration for the nationally observed Great American Smokeout came from a Randolph High School guidance councilor, who observed in a 1969 discussion with students that he could send all of them to college if he had a nickel for every cigarette butt he found on the ground. This touched off an effort by the Randolph High School class of 1970, supported by the Randolph Rotary Club, to have local smokers give it up for a day and put the savings toward a college scholarship fund. The event went national in 1977.

Registered historic places

Randolph is home to four Nationally Registered Historic Places:

 Jonathan Belcher House, 360 N. Main St. (Listed April 30, 1976)Home of Jonathan Belcher (1767–1839), built in 1806, home to the Randolph  Club (formerly Ladies Library Association) since 1911.
 Stetson Hall, 6 S. Main St. (Listed December 7, 2011)Former Town Hall, built in 1842.
 Ponkapoag Camp of Appalachian Mountain Club (Listed September 25, 1980)
 Gills Farm Archaeological District (Listed October 4, 1983)

Geography
Randolph is located at  (42.173417, −71.049124). Located fifteen miles south of Boston, at the intersection of Routes 128 and 24, Randolph's location has been an important factor in its economic and social history. Randolph is located in eastern Massachusetts, bordered by Milton and Quincy on the north, Braintree and
Holbrook on the east, Canton on the west, and Avon and Stoughton on the south and southwest. Randolph is 15 miles south of Boston and 211 miles from New York City.

According to the United States Census Bureau, the town has a total area of 10.5 square miles (27.2 km2), of which 10.1 square miles (26.1 km2) is land and 0.4 square mile (1.1 km2) (4.10%) is water. It is drained by the Cochato River and Blue Hill River, which flow into the Neponset River.

Demographics

As of the census of 2010, there were 32,158 people, 11,564 households, and 8,038 families residing in the city. The racial makeup of the city was 41.6% White, 38.3% Black or African American, 0.3% Native American, 12.4% Asian (6.3% Vietnamese, 3.3% Chinese, 0.9% Filipino, 0.8% Asian Indian) 0.0% Pacific Islander, 3.7% from other races, and 3.5% from two or more races. Hispanic or Latino of any race were 6.4% of the population.

Randolph is one of the fastest growing minority cities in America.  
60% of all elementary school students are black, 21% Hispanic (predominately Dominican), 11% White, and 8% Asian.

There were 11,564 households, out of which 29.4% had children under the age of 18 living with them, 46.7% were married couples living together, 17.4% had a female householder with no husband present, and 30.5% were non-families. 24.5% of all households were made up of individuals, and 9.6% had someone living alone who was 65 years of age or older. The average household size was 2.75 and the average family size was 3.31.

In the town, the population was spread out, with 21.7% under the age of 18, 8.7% from 18 to 24, 26.5% from 25 to 44, 29.4% from 45 to 64, and 13.4% who were 65 years of age or older. The median age was 38 years. For every 100 females, there were 91.7 males. For every 100 females age 18 and over, there were 88.0 males.

The median income for a household in the town was $55,255, and the median income for a family was $61,942. Males had a median income of $41,719 versus $32,500 for females. The per capita income for the town was $23,413. About 5.5% of families and 6.5% of the population were below the poverty line, including 4.5% of those under age 18 and 5.0% of those age 65 or over.

Transportation
Randolph is situated in the Greater Boston Area, which has excellent rail, air, and highway facilities. State Route 128 and Interstate Route 495 divide the region into inner and outer zones, which are connected by numerous "spokes" providing direct access to the airport, port, and intermodal facilities of Boston.

Major highways
The principal highways are the concurrent Interstate 93 and U.S. Route 1, which clips the northern edge of the town; parallel north–south State Massachusetts Route 24 (the Fall River Expressway) and Massachusetts Route 28.  Massachusetts Route 139 runs east–west through the town.

Rail
Commuter rail service to South Station, Boston, is available on the Middleboro line from the Holbrook/Randolph Rail Station located on the Holbrook/Randolph Town line and Union Street (Route 139). The MBTA Red Line is accessible in Braintree and Quincy.

Bus
Randolph is a member of the Massachusetts Bay Transportation Authority (MBTA) which provides fixed route service to Quincy Adams, Quincy Center and Ashmont Stations. Randolph is served by Bus 240 from Ashmont Station and the 238 Bus from Quincy Center Station. The MBTA also provides THE RIDE, a paratransit service for the elderly and disabled.

The Brockton Area Transit Authority (BAT) provides bus service to Brockton from Ashmont and vice versa.

Airport
Most area residents use Logan International Airport for air transportation.

Government
Randolph was originally governed by a representative town meeting form of government. In a special election on April 7, 2009, the town adopted a new charter that became effective in January 2010, changing the town's form of government to a council-manager system. The current town manager is Brian P. Howard.

Current town council members are:
 William Alexopoulos, President, at-large
 Natacha Clerger, Vice President, at-large
 Richard Brewer, at-large
 James F. Burgess, Jr., at-large
 Ryan Egan, at-large
 Kevin O'Connell, District 1
 Jesse A. Gordon, District 2
 Katrina Huff-Larmond, District 3
 Christos Alexopoulos, District 4

Other Boards & Commissions 
 Board of Assessors (3 members)
 Board of Health (3 members)
 Planning Board (5 members)
 School Committee (7 members)

School Committee

 Andrea Nixon, Chair
 Lisa Millwood, Vice Chair
 Pamela Davis
 Cheryl Frazier
 Ida Gordon
 Christina Paul
 William Alexopoulos, Town Council Rep.

Education

Randolph has a high school serving grades 9–12 (Randolph High School), a middle school serving grades 6, 7, and 8 (Randolph Community Middle School), and four elementary schools serving grades K–5:
 John F. Kennedy Elementary School
 Margaret L. Donovan Elementary School
 Martin E. Young Elementary School
 Elizabeth G. Lyons Elementary School

Pre-elementary education (kindergarten) is provided at the respective home schools, the Charles G. Devine Early Childhood Center having been closed in 2007.  As part of the Blue Hills Regional School District, Randolph students entering the ninth grade may opt to attend the Blue Hills Regional Technical School, commonly referred to as "Blue Hills" or the Norfolk County Agricultural High School, known as "Aggie", instead of Randolph High School. The school system is run by the School Committee.

Notable people
 Ebenezer Alden, physician, biographer, bibliophile
 Audie Cornish, journalist
 Danny Davis, bandleader and producer
 Mary E. Wilkins Freeman, author
 Bill Kenney, football coach
 Rod Langway, Hockey Hall of Fame hockey player
 Robert C.'Bob' Long, Major League Baseball Umpire.
 Gene McAuliffe, baseball player
 Shabazz Napier, NBA player for the Washington Wizards
 Liam O'Donnell, director and film producer
 Jordan Rich, radio talk show host
 William Rimmer, painter & sculptor
 Mark Snyder, radio host, newspaper columnist & social media new site publisher
 Clinton Sparks, Grammy nominated music producer & hip hop DJ
 Scott D. Tingle, NASA astronaut
 Touré (né Touré Neblett), writer, music journalist, cultural critic, and television personality

References

External links

 Town of Randolph, Massachusetts

 
Cities in Massachusetts
Cities in Norfolk County, Massachusetts